Perspectives on Behavior Science is a semiannual peer-reviewed scientific journal covering behavior analysis. It was established in 1978 and is published by Springer Science+Business Media on behalf of the Association for Behavior Analysis International, of which it is the official journal. It was published as The Behavior Analyst until it obtained its current name in 2018. The editor-in-chief is M. Christopher Newland (Auburn University). According to the Journal Citation Reports, the journal has a 2020 impact factor of 2.835.

References

External links

Behaviorism journals
Springer Science+Business Media academic journals
Publications established in 1978
Biannual journals
English-language journals
Academic journals associated with international learned and professional societies